World's Craziest Fools is a clip show made by Roughcut TV for BBC Three, presented by Mr. T. It showcases clips, sometimes viral, of people making themselves look like "Fools" (a reference to Mr. T's catchphrase), often by accident. Many clips were from CCTV footage. The videos are shown in different categories such as "Parking Fools", "Drunk Fools", "Workmen Fools", "Criminal Fools", "Assorted Fools", and "Fools Jumping Off Stuff They Shouldn't Be Jumping Off". As would be expected, some categories see more entries than others, and the categories that feature episode-to-episode are not bound to a predetermined structure. Writers on the segments featuring Mr. T include Lee Kern.

Animation
In some segments of the show, animations were used to tell the story of a fool or fools who had either done something reckless or stupid, or criminals who performed crimes and got caught because of a mistake they made or believing they could get away with it when they hadn't.  Other animations were used for phone calls, either to the police or emergency line (the first series featured calls to the police in America, the second series did calls to British Police), or other dumb sounding calls.  In the second series, some clips were used alongside animation for products created by "T-Industries", usually to the tune of a product advertisement.  The animations were done by
Big Red Button and Ben and Will Animation.

Every episode contains a 1-2-minute "Top 5" countdown segment on various categories, such as places not to park or tips on how to be a good policeman. This animation was produced by Christopher Poole and Plastic Horse.

Broadcasting
The first episode aired on 6 June 2011 on BBC Three receiving a large 756,000 overnight audience viewing. A new episode aired on Monday nights at 10:30pm. The show was repeated often throughout the week, from Tuesday to Monday - 7 showings in total. The second episode received a respectable 608,000 in the overnight ratings. However, by the fifth episode, overnight ratings came to a series high peaking at 848,000. Ratings stayed strong for the remainder of the first season. It was also one of the most watched BBC Three shows on BBC iPlayer.

On 3 February 2012, BBC Three announced that the show would return for a second series. It started airing on 7 January 2013 at 10:00pm.

The series also airs in Canada on the Much Music network, in New Zealand on TV2, in Denmark on TV2 Zulu, in Australia on 7mate, in Italy on DMAX and in Portugal on Odisseia.
Parts of the show can also being seen on the Dutch channel Veronica. UPtv in the United States began running the show in syndication in October 2017.

Since October 2019 both seasons have been available on Amazon Prime Video although they are packaged as a twenty episode single season. Episodes differ slightly from when originally broadcast, due to clips being removed due to copyright reasons.

Episode list and viewing figures

Season 1 (2011)

Season 2 (2013)

References

External links

2011 British television series debuts
2013 British television series endings
BBC television comedy
English-language television shows
Mr. T